Divaldo Pereira Franco (born May 5, 1927 in Feira de Santana, Brazil) is a Spiritist speaker and medium.

Biography 
He represented Spiritism as a delegate to the United Nations August 28–31st, 2000, Millennium World Peace Summit of Religious and Spiritual Leaders. After the death of Brazilian medium Chico Xavier in 2002, Divaldo became the most representative figure of Spiritism worldwide.

On March 12, 2004, Divaldo presented the seminar Understanding Spiritual and Mental Health at the University of Maryland School of Medicine, in Baltimore.

"Divaldo Pereira Franco offers a psychologized counterpoint to the popular Spiritism paradigm established around the work of Chico Xavier".

"Divaldo Pereira Franco had a prevalent role in the implantation and consolidation of the Spiritist Movement in the United States."

Books about Divaldo 
 "Divaldo, médium ou gênio?" – by journalist Fernando Pinto, 1976, 160 pages;
 "Moldando o Terceiro Milênio – Life and work of Divaldo Pereira Franco" – By journalist Fernando Worm;
 "O Semeador de Estrelas" – By Suely Caldas Schubert – Stories about Divaldo's life;
 "Viagens e entrevistas" – By Yvon Luz – Different interviews with Divaldo.

Books by Divaldo translated to English 
 Child of God (1986)
 Recipes for Peace (1996)
 Self-Discovery: An Inner Search (2005)
 Living and Loving (Audio CD – 2005)
 The Dynamics of Our Sixth Sense (2006)
 Obsession (1979)
 I Love Myself, I Am Addiction-free: Spiritual Tools to Fight Addiction (2005)
 The New Generation: The Spiritist View on Indigo and Crystal Children with Vanessa Anseloni (2007)
 Open Your Heart and Find Happiness (2006)
 Therapeutic Visualizations (Audio CD – 2005)
 Understanding Spiritual and Mental Health (2005)

References

External links
 Divaldo Franco – English Bio
 Mansion of the Way 
 Peace and You Movement by Divaldo Franco

1927 births
Living people
People from Feira de Santana
Brazilian spiritual mediums